Zuluaga is a surname. Notable people with the surname include:
Antonio Zuluaga (1931–2012), Colombian painter and sculptor
Arnold Zuluaga (born 1983), Peruvian football player
Camila Zuluaga (born 1985), Colombian television journalist
David Zuluaga (born 1956), Peruvian football player
Fabiola Zuluaga (born 1979), Colombian tennis player
Francisco Zuluaga (1929–1993), Colombian football player

Luz Marina Zuluaga (born 1938), Miss Universe winner from Colombia
Óscar Iván Zuluaga (born 1959), Colombian politician